Ordinary Happiness is a 2019 Italian comedy-drama film directed by Daniele Luchetti.

Cast
Pif as Paolo
Thony as Agata
Renato Carpentieri as Paradise employee
Franz Cantalupo as Giuseppe
Vincenzo Ferrera as Carmine
Roberta Caronia as Silvana
Angelica Alleruzzo as Aurora
Francesco Giammanco as Filippo

References

External links

2019 films
Films directed by Daniele Luchetti
Films set in Palermo
Films shot in Palermo
2010s Italian-language films
2019 comedy-drama films
Italian comedy-drama films
2010s Italian films